Juan Station is a subway station on the Seoul Metropolitan Subway Line 1 and Incheon Subway Line 2. This station receives the second-highest number of crowds along the entire Incheon line due to its proximity to the Downtown area. It is also near Inha University and Inha Technical College.

history 
A long history of business started in 1910
On September 18, 1899, after the opening of the Gyeongin Line, which signaled the start of Korean railways, the operation began with the establishment of Juan Station on October 21, 1910. After the opening of the Gyeongin Line double track and the opening of the metropolitan subway, a new onboard station was built in 1978, and an underground station was completed in 1989. It is a two-story shipboard station with a reinforced concrete slab roof with an ancillary building of 25.7 square meters on a scale of 549.7 square meters. In 2016, Incheon Metro Line 2 was opened and became a transfer station. As it is located in the center of Incheon, it is characterized not only by its proximity to public facilities and commercial days, but also by a well-developed transportation network such as roads and buses.

Entrance 
 Exit 1 : Juan 1-dong, Inha University, Inha Technical College.
 Exit 2 : MMA (Body Counselor), Incheon District Court, Juan Park.
 Exit 3 : Juan 5-dong, North-Juan Elementary School.
 Exit 4 : Juan 5-dong Community Service Center. Ganseok 4-dong.

Passengers
According to the data, there is a rapid reduction of using passengers. It is believed to cause those situations after operation of metropolitan buses system.

References

External links 
한국철도공사

Seoul Metropolitan Subway stations
Metro stations in Incheon
Railway stations opened in 1910
Michuhol District
주안 극동스타클래스 더 로얄